Lake Central School Corporation is a public school district in St. John Township, Indiana.

Schools
Lake Central School Corporation operates several schools in St. John Township, Indiana. Its students come from the towns of St. John, Dyer (north of 101st Ave), the entire town of Schererville, unincorporated Crown Point (north of 101st Ave), and the southeastern section of Griffith that is within St. John Township.

District Schools

Administration 
Current Administration The corporation's administration office is located in the south part of Lake Central High School.

School Board 
Current School Board

School Bus Fleet
Lake Central operates a fleet BlueBird and IC Corporation buses. Lake Central has begun a replacement plan to replace all of their diesel buses with propane fueled buses.

References

External links
 

Education in Lake County, Indiana
School districts in Indiana
1967 establishments in Indiana
School districts established in 1967